The amazon parrots are 35 species of parrots that comprise the genus Amazona.  They are native to the New World, ranging from South America to Mexico and the Caribbean. Amazon parrots range in size from medium to large, and have relatively short, rather square tails. They are predominantly green, with accenting colours that are quite vivid in some species.

The taxonomy of the yellow-crowned amazon (Amazona ochrocephala complex) is disputed, with some authorities listing only a single species (A. ochrocephala), and others splitting it into as many as three species (A. ochrocephala, A. auropalliata and A. oratrix). The yellow-faced parrot, Alipiopsitta xanthops, was traditionally placed within the amazon parrot genus, but recent research has shown that it is more closely related to the short-tailed parrot and species from the genus Pionus; as a result, it has been transferred to the monotypic genus Alipiopsitta.

Two extinct species have been postulated, based on limited evidence. They are the Martinique amazon (Amazona martinica) and the Guadeloupe amazon (Amazona violacea). Amazon parrots were described living on Guadeloupe by Jean-Baptiste Du Tertre in 1667 and by Jean-Baptiste Labat in 1742, and they were called Psittacus violaceus at that time. Labat also described amazon parrots living on Martinique. There are no specimens or remains of either island population, so their taxonomy may never be fully elucidated. Their status as separate species is unproven and they are regarded as hypothetical extinct species.

In 2017 a study published by ornithologists Tony Silva, Antonio Guzmán, Adam D. Urantówka and Paweł Mackiewicz proposed a new species for the Yucatan Peninsula area (Mexico), being this named blue-winged amazon (Amazona gomezgarzai). However, subsequent studies question its validity, indicating that these organisms possibly had an artificial hybrid origin.

Species

See also
List of parrots
Neotropical parrot
List of macaws
List of Ramphastos species and subspecies

References

Bibliography
Collar N (1997) "Family Psittacidae (Parrots)" in Handbook of the Birds of the World Volume 4; Sandgrouse to Cuckoos (eds del Hoyo J, Elliott A, Sargatal J) Lynx Edicions:Barcelona. 

'
'
Amazon parrots